Modern Russian military ranks trace their roots to the Table of Ranks established by Peter the Great. Most of the rank names were borrowed from existing German/Prussian, French, English, Dutch, and Polish ranks upon the formation of the Russian regular army in the late 17th century.

Russian Tsardom 
The Kievan Rus had no standing army apart from small druzhina (дружи́на), a permanent group of personal guards for the local ruler (knyaz, prince); an individual member of such a unit called a druzhinnik (дружи́нник). In times of war, the knyaz raised a militia comprising volunteers from the peasantry, and the druzhina served as the core of the troops. Each local knyaz served as the military leader of his troops. Such arrangements had no need for permanent ranks or positions; they were created ad hoc, based on the task(s) in hand.

Upon the formation of Strelets troops in the mid-16th century, the low-level commanding officers were appointed to one of the following ranks:

 strelets (стреле́ц), a basic soldier
 desyatnik (деся́тник, 'of ten men'), acting as sergeant/corporal
 sotnik (со́тник, 'of hundred men'), acting as captain

These were not personal ranks and were retained only as long as the officer held the position. For battles, the knyaz organized his troops into temporary high-level units, usually a polk (полк, Old Slavonic for group of troops), a regiment commanded by a golova (голова́, head) or voyevoda (воево́да, war leader); these commanding positions were not permanent and did not persist after the battle. The cossack cavalry units had their own ranks of Kazak (коза́к), yesaul (есау́л) and ataman (атама́н); they were not comparable to the strelets ranks.

Upon the formation of standing regiments (prikaz, later polk) by Ivan IV, new ranks insinuated themselves into the hierarchy between the existing grades: pyatidesyatnik (пятидеся́тник, of fifty men) acting as lieutenant, golova acting as colonel of the regiment (also, tysyatskiy (ты́сяцкий, 'of thousand men'). Later, a polugolova (полуголова́. half-golova) rank appeared; eventually golova was renamed polkovnik (полко́вник, of the polk), and polugolova was renamed podpolkovnik (sub-polkovnik). As usual, voyevoda was simply a commander of a large military group and not a rank of any kind.

Later, under the Romanov dynasty the companies of foreign mercenaries were formed; these incorporated the foreign ranks of Lieutenant and Rittmeister. They were later changed into the New Regiments of the Streltsy Troops and more Western ranks were adopted, including General. Finally, by 1680 the ranks of the New Regiments were unified with Strelets Troops.

Russian Empire 

During the beginning of the 18th century, military ranks were frequently changed by the tsar during efforts to reform the army and create a strong Navy. These many changes were routinely documented into Army's Rules of engagement since 1716, until they were finally incorporated into the first variant of Table of Ranks in 1722. Comparing to Strelets Troops, a few more non-commissioned ranks were added, the soldier rank was replaced with many speciality ranks and a few more General ranks were added. The naval ranks were created from scratch, ranks for the naval infantry and engineers would only come in the 19th century.

The officers were styled according to their rank as defined by the Table.

1722–1917: Army
By 1722, the ranks of both enlisted staff and commissioned/non-commissioned officers were somewhat settled; these ranks survived until the Russian Revolution with only minor adjustments.

Captain-Poruchik rank is comparable to Lieutenant Captain. Note that Poruchik can sometimes be styled as Porutchik, as it was originally written by the tsar himself.

Commissioned officers of artillery and engineers enjoyed a handicap of 1 grade, and the Leib Guards units enjoyed a handicap of 2 grades, ending in Life Guards Colonel.

In the 1798–1884 timeline, the General ranks were streamlined and the Brigadier rank was abolished. The Captain-Poruchik rank was reestablished again, this time as Staff-Captain. The Second Major and First Major ranks were united. In 1826, Russian Army adopted shoulder insignia and distinct Cossack cavalry ranks.

In 1884, Major and Captain-Lieutenant ranks were abolished again and the ranks below were shifted several grades up. The latter was not reintroduced until 1907, but then again abolished in 1911.

1722–1917: Navy 
As stated earlier, most of the naval ranks and rates were formed from scratch in the 18th century, with many changes since then. Ranks for naval infantry, shore service personnel and engineers would only come in the 19th century.

White Movement (1918-1921) 

Although the White Movement generally retained the old imperial system, there were a few modifications. Most importantly, the ranks of praporshchik and lieutenant colonel were abolished as redundant by 1919.

RSFSR and Soviet Union

1918–1925
The October Revolution of 1917 abolished the privileges of the Russian nobility (Dvoryanstvo). The Table of Ranks was abolished and so were personal military ranks.
Based on the teachings of Karl Marx to replace a regular army with the general arming of the people, the Bolsheviks abolished the Imperial army on 16 March 1918. But the need for an armed struggle against the counter-revolution, and foreign military intervention forced the CEC and the CPC, January 15, 1918 to issue a decree establishing of the "Workers' and Peasants' Red Army", very early before the disbandment of the Imperial ground forces.

At first the new army had no ranks, aside from the single rank of "RedArmyMan". However, due to a real need, first informally and then more formally (although no document on an introduction of ranks or names of commanders was issued) in official correspondence acronyms began to appear representing position-holder titles. For example, komdiv was an acronym of Division Commander; likewise kombat stood for Battalion Commander, etc. By the middle of the Civil War (January 1919), these "positional ranks" became quite formal, and since January 1920 the names of officers was fixed by the Order of the Red Army. Instead of ranks, these were officially known as "categories of the Red Army." This system was maintained until May 1924. Some of these acronyms have survived as informal position names to the present day.

During the civil war ships did not play a significant role. Many of the sailors and petty officers of the fleet went to fight on land in the Red Army. For a long time a scale of naval ranks did not exist at all. Most of the naval officers were addressed either by their position or by their tsarist rank with the addition of the prefix byvshiy (abbreviated as "b."), which meant "former". Since 1924, the real rehabilitation and creation of the fleet began. Personal ranks as such did not exist during this period in the Navy.

By then, the only new rank created was the Sergeant Major (Starshina) rank in the Red Army. It was first introduced in the Worker's and Peasant's Red Navy at the same time, with the old Imperial Naval rank of Bootsmann in the Navy the only old rank still used.

The Soviet Air Forces began as a committee for ex-Imperial military aviation in 1918, and was later transformed into a separate service later as the Workers and Peasants Red Air Fleet. It shared the same ranks as the Army and the naval air component shared the ranks of its mother service.

1925–1935
By that year, the ranks were expanded to match the military ranks of other countries' armed forces. The Soviet Air Forces soon received its own ranks.

1935–1940
Personal ranks were formally introduced in the Red Army on September 22, 1935, including the rank of Marshal of the Soviet Union that was adopted the year before.

Ranks of Junior Lieutenant and Junior Military Technician were introduced in 1937. Also restored were most of the military officer ranks in the Army and Navy, except for the General officer ranks and the Admiral officer ranks, with the naval rank of 3rd-class Captain being the new officer rank introduced.

1940–1943
General ranks were restored in May 1940. The new ranks were based on the military ranks of the Russian Empire, although they underwent some modifications; modified Imperial rank insignia were reintroduced in 1943. The new ranks also abolished the specialist ranks for the other arms and services, and they were replaced by the new ranks with the service name attached. 

Ranks "Lieutenant Colonel" and "Senior Battalion Commissar" were introduced in 1937. By 1940 the Army rank of Corporal and the Naval rank of Midshipman were revived, and the old rank of Junior Sergeant reinstated into its modern form (the rank is from the Estonian Army but has a Russian origin in the Imperial Russian Army).

In 1942, the political commissars' service in the Red Army was finally disbanded for good, and its ranks dissolved.

1943–1991
In 1943, all ranks became standardized throughout the Soviet Armed Forces, with the full inclusion of Air/Arm/Branch Marshal and Air/Arm/Branch Chief Marshal ranks. All specialist ranks remaining were replaced by the 1940 standard ranks with the service name attached to them, and Private and Seaman became the basic enlisted ranks. The new Imperial Russian Armed Forces-style shoulder rank insignia also debuted.

From 1943 to 1961, naval ranks were adjusted to match the naval ranks of other countries. The rank of Admiral of the Fleet was introduced during the Great Patriotic War, and was the equivalent rank to Marshal of the Soviet Union that in 1955, it was renamed Admiral of the Fleet of the Soviet Union. The rank was soon revived in 1962 as a General of the Army-equivalent rank in compliance to new Soviet Navy regulations for officers.

On June 27, 1945, the rank of Generalissimus Sovietskogo Soyuza (Generalissimus of the Soviet Union) was created and granted to Joseph Stalin following the tradition of the Russian Imperial Army which granted to the Tsars the military rank in their capacity as Commanders-in-Chief. Formally it existed until 1993 but it was never used after Stalin's death.

In the 1970s, the non-commissioned officers serving under contract and holding Starshina (Master Sergeant) rank were reassigned to newly created Praporshchik rank (not to be confused with similarly named Russian Empire rank of commissioned officers); starshina was reserved for conscripts only. In the Soviet Navy, however, as the Midshipman rank was formally elevated to that of a warrant officer, the NCO role of Midshipmen was replaced by the new rank of Ship Chief Master Sergeant as a result of the naval rank change. At the same time all rank insignia became uniform for the Army and Air Force plus the other services, the Navy retained theirs.

Generals of the Army and Admirals soon had their insignia changed in 1974.

The final change was in 1981 when Senior Praporshchik and Senior Midshipman ranks were added in the ranks of warrant officers.

The table of Soviet military ranks can see in military ranks of the Soviet Union or in the section below (as they were the same as present military ranks of the Russian Federation).

Russian Federation
The independent Russia inherited the ranks of the Soviet Union, although the insignia and uniforms were altered a little. The following is a table of ranks of the Armed Forces of the Russian Federation.

Russian armed forces have two styles of ranks: deck ranks (navy style ranks) and troop ranks (army and other forces style ranks). The following table of Ranks is based on those of the Russian Federation.

Troop ranks are used by:
 Ministry of Defence
 Ground Forces (Army)
 Aerospace Forces
 Navy — Naval Infantry (Marines), Naval Aviation other various shore services of the navy
 Special Operations Forces
 Strategic Importance Missile Troops (Independent Corps)
 Airborne Troops (Independent Corps)
 Federal Agency of Special Construction
 Railway Troops of the Russian Federation
 Rear of the Armed Forces of the Russian Federation
 Ministry of Internal Affairs (MVD)
 Police, formerly Militia
 National Guard of Russia
 National Guard Forces Command
 Federal Security Service (FSB) and
 Border Service of the FSB
 Federal Protective Service (FSO)
 Foreign Intelligence Service (SVR)
 Chief directorate of special programs of the President
 Ministry of Emergency Situations (EMERCOM)
 Civil Defense Troops
 Military personnel of the Russian State Fire Service

Deck (Navy) ranks are used by:
 Ministry of Defence
 Navy — deck personnel
 Federal Security Service
 Coast Guard of the Border Service of FSB
 National Guard
 National Guard Naval Service Corps

The highest troop rank is Marshal of the Russian Federation.

The highest Navy 'deck' rank is Admiral of the Fleet. In the Soviet era the rank Admiral of the Fleet of the Soviet Union was equivalent to the rank of Marshal and only three persons were given that rank. Since 1991 this rank is no longer used.

Ranks can have additional descriptors according to assignment or status. For example, the rank of a serviceman of a "Guards" unit, formation or ship may be followed by the word "Guards" ("Gefreitor of Guards"); the rank of a serviceman of the legal, medical or veterinary professions is followed by "of Justice", "of the Medical service", or "of the Veterinary service" ("Captain of the Medical Service"); and the rank of a reserve or retired serviceman is followed by the words “Reserve” or “Retired,” respectively ("Major of Reserve"). The Russian Federation abolished the descriptor "of Aviation" for pilots, however, that descriptor is still in common use.

Note: the descriptor "of Aviation" has been officially abolished but usage is still common within the Air Force and Naval Aviation.

On March 11, 2010, by virtue of Law No.2010-293 of the President of Russia, a new set of rank insignia debuted. Privates, Airmen and Seamen sport plain shoulder epaulettes and the chevrons removed for the ranks of senior NCOs and are now replaced by plain bars (small horizontal from Corporal/Senior Airman/Leading Seaman to Sergeant/Staff Sergeant/Petty Officer increasing by seniority, large horizontal for Staff Sergeants, Flight Sergeants and Chief Petty Officers, and vertical bars for petty officers and Ship CPOs).

WO's and Officer ranks received updated shoulder rank epaulettes (and for the Navy, cuff rank insignia) and all General Officer and Flag Officer rank insignia now reflecting service affiliation in the duty dress uniform (the old pattern epaulettes were replaced by the army green, aerospace forces blue and navy blue epaulettes (duty dress depending on service) and gold (parade dress) epaulettes similar to those used in the mid 1970s by the Soviet Armed Forces). This was also the case for the Marshal of the Russian Federation rank epaulette, which still retained the Coat of arms of Russia and the Marshal's Star. But this change is now evident in the battle dress and duty uniforms only, in the new 2008 dress uniforms the change is evident in the enlisted and NCO epaulettes, but in the epaulettes of all warrant officers and officers the gold and black epaulettes stayed as is in the dress uniforms.

As part of the 2008 Russian military reform, the Praporshchik (Warrant Officer) rank was effectively abolished in the Russian Armed Forces, though the rank still may be used in other uniformed services of the government such as the Interior Ministry, the Police, The Ministry of Emergency Situations and the Border Guard Service.

The general and flag officer ranks changed again on February 22, 2013. Thus, for Generals of the Army and Fleet Admirals, instead of sporting 4 stars, the shoulder rank insignia for both were changed back to the Marshal's Star with additional emblems for Generals of the Army and Fleet Admiral's Star for Fleet Admirals. Some retired general and flag officers were spotted wearing the old pre-1994 rank insignia instead of the new.

See also
List of comparative military ranks
Military ranks of the Soviet Union
Military ranks, special ranks and class rates in Russia
Rank insignia of the Russian Police
Russian Armed Forces
Russia

Notes

External links
 Ministry of Internal Affairs (MVD)
 Federal Security Service (FSB)
 Border Guard service of the FSB.
 Ministry of Civil Defense And Emergency Situations.
 Federal Law No. 58-FZ from March 12, 1998 "On military duty and military service" (in Russian)
 Presidential Decree No. 531 from May 8, 2005 "On military uniform, rank insignia of the servicemen and state bodies' rank insignia" (in Russian)
 Анатомия армии

Military of the Russian Empire
Military ranks of the Soviet Union
Military ranks of Russia